Carlos Cedric Moubamba Saib (born 14 October 1979) is a Gabonese former professional footballer who played as a midfielder.

Club career 
Moubamba played previously for AC Bongoville, US Bitam, Sogéa FC, USM Libreville and AS Mangasport. He also played for Omani club Dhofar S.C.S.C. with his national team members Etienne Bito'o and Congolese Sita Milandou and DR Congo based Champion TP Mazembe.

International career 
Moubamba was a regular member of the Gabon national team and played 76 games scoring three goals.

Career statistics
Scores and results list Gabon's goal tally first, score column indicates score after each Moubamba goal.

Notes

1979 births
Living people
Gabonese footballers
Association football midfielders
Gabon international footballers
2000 African Cup of Nations players
2010 Africa Cup of Nations players
Dhofar Club players
2012 Africa Cup of Nations players
Gabonese expatriate footballers
Gabonese expatriate sportspeople in the Democratic Republic of the Congo
Expatriate footballers in the Democratic Republic of the Congo
Gabonese expatriate sportspeople in Oman
Expatriate footballers in Oman
21st-century Gabonese people